Jack Crawford and Adrian Quist were the defending champions, but lost in the third round to Jean Borotra and Jacques Brugnon.

Pat Hughes and Raymond Tuckey defeated Charles Hare and Frank Wilde in the final, 6–4, 3–6, 7–9, 6–1, 6–4 to win the gentlemen's doubles tennis title at the 1936 Wimbledon Championship.

Seeds

  Jack Crawford /  Adrian Quist (third round)
  Wilmer Allison /  John Van Ryn (semifinals)
  Don Budge /  Gene Mako (third round)
  Pat Hughes /  Raymond Tuckey (champions)

Draw

Finals

Top half

Section 1

The nationality of AW Patterson is unknown.

Section 2

Bottom half

Section 3

Section 4

References

External links

Men's Doubles
Wimbledon Championship by year – Men's doubles